Verftsbrua (Norwegian for "Yard Bridge"), also popularly called Blomsterbrua ("Flower Bridge"), is a bridge at the bay of Trondheim. The bridge, built in 2003, spans . The name Verftsbrua comes from the nearby shipyard, Trondhjems mekaniske Værksted, while the name Blomsterbrua is due to the bridge featuring flowerbeds along its edges.

It is mainly used for walking and biking, with over 5,000 people using it every day. It was built so people could reach the centre of the city without taking a long detour. The bridge is a retractable, and can be opened to allow taller boats to pass.

References

Buildings and structures in Trondheim
Bridges in Trøndelag
Bridges completed in 2003